Sabinas is one of the 38 municipalities of Coahuila, in north-eastern Mexico. The municipal seat lies at Sabinas. The municipality covers an area of 2345.2 km2.

As of 2005, the municipality had a total population of 53,042 .

References

Municipalities of Coahuila